The Eighth Route Army, officially known as the 18th Group Army  of the National Revolutionary Army of the Republic of China, was a group army under the command of the Chinese Communist Party, nominally within the structure of the Chinese military headed by the Chinese Nationalist Party during the Second Sino-Japanese War.

The Eighth Route Army was created from the Chinese Red Army on September 22, 1937, when the Chinese Communists and Chinese Nationalists formed the Second United Front against Japan at the outbreak of the Second Sino-Japanese War, as the Chinese theater was known in World War II. Together with the New Fourth Army, the Eighth Route Army formed the main Communist fighting force during the war and was commanded by Communist party leader Mao Zedong and general Zhu De. Though officially designated the 18th Group Army by the Nationalists, the unit was referred to by the Chinese Communists and Japanese military as the Eighth Route Army. The Eighth Route Army wore Nationalist uniforms and flew the flag of the Republic of China and waged mostly guerrilla war against the Japanese, collaborationist forces and, later in the war, other Nationalist forces. The unit was renamed the People's Liberation Army in 1947, after the end of World War II, as the Chinese Communists and Nationalists resumed the Chinese Civil War.

The Eighth Route Army consisted of three divisions (the 115th, which was commanded by Lin Biao, the 120th under He Long, and the 129th under Liu Bocheng). During World War II, the Eighth Route Army operated mostly in North China, infiltrating behind Japanese lines, to establish guerrilla bases in rural and remote areas. The main units of the Eighth Route Army were aided by local militias organized from the peasantry.

The Communist Party's liaison offices in cities under Nationalist control such as Chongqing, Guilin and Dihua (Ürümqi) were called Eighth Route Army Offices.

Ethnic Koreans who fought in the Eighth Route Army later joined the Korean People's Army.

Organization

1937 
In August 1937, the Eighth Route Army had three divisions.

1940 
In Winter 1940 the Eighth Route Army had increased to 400,000 soldiers.

See also 
 Guerrilla
 National Revolutionary Army
 People's Liberation Army

References

with New Fourth Army12 October 1937-1 November 1948

 
Armies of the National Revolutionary Army
Military units and formations established in 1937
1937 establishments in China
Armies led by the Chinese Communist Party in World War II